Yasnogorsky (masculine), Yasnogorskaya (feminine), or Yasnogorskoye (neuter) is the name of several rural localities in Russia:
Yasnogorsky, Kemerovo Oblast, a settlement in Yasnogorskaya Rural Territory of Kemerovsky District of Kemerovo Oblast
Yasnogorsky, Orenburg Oblast, a settlement in Yasnogorsky Selsoviet of Novosergiyevsky District of Orenburg Oblast